was a district located in Saga Prefecture, Japan.

As of 2003, the district had an estimated population of 45,910 and a density of 478.98 persons per km2. The total area was 95.85 km2.

Former towns and villages
 Ashikari
 Mikatsuki
 Ogi
 Ushizu

Merger
On March 1, 2005 - the former town of Ogi absorbed the towns of Ashikari, Mikatsuki and Ushizu to create the city of Ogi. Ogi District was dissolved as a result of this merger.

Former districts of Saga Prefecture